Singmogil or Sikmogil (hanja: 植木日) is a holiday in South Korea, the Korean Arbor Day. It is celebrated annually on April 5.

Background
The idea of Singmogil was to celebrate forestry and the development of national history. The day of April 5 was chosen for its historical significance. On April 5, Silla achieved the unification of the Three Kingdoms of Korea.

History
Singmogil was designated by presidential decree in 1949 following legislation by the National Assembly.

In 1960, Singmogil's status as a holiday was abolished and April 5 was treated as any other day. However, the following year the official status of the holiday was restored.

In 2006, Singmogil's holiday status was abolished again.

Activities
On Singmogil, South Korean people plant trees that are appropriate for the region's climate. Government offices help people plant trees. During the month of Singmogil, the government encourages the economical utilization of forestry by designating a "National Planting Period." Even though Singmogil was abolished in 2006 as a holiday, the South Korean public continues to take part in meaningful activities.

See also 
 Arbor Day

References 

Forestry in South Korea
Observances in South Korea
Forestry events
April observances
Spring (season) events in South Korea